2001 Denmark Open is a darts tournament, which took place in Denmark, Farum in 2001.

Results

References

2001 in darts
2001 in Danish sport
Darts in Denmark